"Like Lightning" is a 2019 song by Foals.

Like Lightning may also refer to:

 "Like Lightning", a 2016 song by Havana Brown, featuring Dawin
 "Like Lightning", a 2016 song by Idina Menzel from her album Idina

See also
 Lightning (disambiguation)